Resket-e Sofla (also Romanized as Resket-e Soflá; also known as Pā’īn Resket) is a village in Farim Rural District, Dodangeh District, Sari County, Mazandaran Province, Iran. At the 2006 census, its population was 49, in 16 families.

References 

Populated places in Sari County